In hyperbolic geometry, the Klein quartic, named after Felix Klein, is a compact Riemann surface of genus  with the highest possible order automorphism group for this genus, namely order  orientation-preserving automorphisms, and  automorphisms if orientation may be reversed. As such, the Klein quartic is the Hurwitz surface of lowest possible genus; see Hurwitz's automorphisms theorem.

Klein's quartic occurs in many branches of mathematics, in contexts including representation theory, homology theory, octonion multiplication, Fermat's Last Theorem, and the Stark–Heegner theorem on imaginary quadratic number fields of class number one; see  for a survey of properties.

Originally, the "Klein quartic" referred specifically to the subset of the complex projective plane  defined by an algebraic equation. This has a specific Riemannian metric (that makes it a minimal surface in ), under which its Gaussian curvature is not constant. This set of conformally equivalent Riemannian surfaces is precisely the same as all compact Riemannian surfaces of genus 3 whose conformal automorphism group is isomorphic to the unique simple group of order 168. By covering space theory, the group  mentioned above is isomorphic to the fundamental group of the compact surface of genus .

Closed and open forms 
It is important to distinguish two different forms of the quartic. The closed quartic is what is generally meant in geometry; topologically it has genus 3 and is a compact space. The open or "punctured" quartic is of interest in number theory; topologically it is a genus 3 surface with 24 punctures, and geometrically these punctures are cusps. The open quartic may be obtained (topologically) from the closed quartic by puncturing at the 24 centers of the tiling by regular heptagons, as discussed below. The open and closed quartics have different metrics, though they are both hyperbolic and complete – geometrically, the cusps are "points at infinity", not holes, hence the open quartic is still complete.

As an algebraic curve
The Klein quartic can be viewed as a projective algebraic curve over the complex numbers , defined by the following quartic equation in homogeneous coordinates  on :

Quaternion algebra construction
The compact Klein quartic can be constructed as the quotient of the hyperbolic plane by the action of a suitable Fuchsian group  which is the principal congruence subgroup associated with the ideal  in the ring of algebraic integers  of the field  where .  Note the identity

exhibiting  as a prime factor of 7 in the ring of algebraic integers.

The group  is a subgroup of the (2,3,7) hyperbolic triangle group.  Namely,  is a subgroup of the group of elements of unit norm in the quaternion algebra generated as an associative algebra by the generators  and relations

Tiling

The Klein quartic admits tilings connected with the symmetry group (a "regular map"), and these are used in understanding the symmetry group, dating back to Klein's original paper. Given a fundamental domain for the group action (for the full, orientation-reversing symmetry group, a (2,3,7) triangle), the reflection domains (images of this domain under the group) give a tiling of the quartic such that the automorphism group of the tiling equals the automorphism group of the surface – reflections in the lines of the tiling correspond to the reflections in the group (reflections in the lines of a given fundamental triangle give a set of 3 generating reflections). This tiling is a quotient of the order-3 bisected heptagonal tiling of the hyperbolic plane (the universal cover of the quartic), and all Hurwitz surfaces are tiled in the same way, as quotients.

This tiling is uniform but not regular (it is by scalene triangles), and often regular tilings are used instead. A quotient of any tiling in the (2,3,7) family can be used (and will have the same automorphism group); of these, the two regular tilings are the tiling by 24 regular hyperbolic heptagons, each of degree 3 (meeting at 56 vertices), and the dual tiling by 56 equilateral triangles, each of degree 7 (meeting at 24 vertices). The order of the automorphism group is related, being the number of polygons times the number of edges in the polygon in both cases.
24 × 7 = 168
56 × 3 = 168
The covering tilings on the hyperbolic plane are the order-3 heptagonal tiling and the order-7 triangular tiling.

The automorphism group can be augmented (by a symmetry which is not realized by a symmetry of the tiling) to yield the Mathieu group M24.

Corresponding to each tiling of the quartic (partition of the quartic variety into subsets) is an abstract polyhedron, which abstracts from the geometry and only reflects the combinatorics of the tiling (this is a general way of obtaining an abstract polytope from a tiling) – the vertices, edges, and faces of the polyhedron are equal as sets to the vertices, edges, and faces of the tiling, with the same incidence relations, and the (combinatorial) automorphism group of the abstract polyhedron equals the (geometric) automorphism group of the quartic. In this way the geometry reduces to combinatorics.

Affine quartic 
The above is a tiling of the projective quartic (a closed manifold); the affine quartic has 24 cusps (topologically, punctures), which correspond to the 24 vertices of the regular triangular tiling, or equivalently the centers of the 24 heptagons in the heptagonal tiling, and can be realized as follows.

(Here  is the congruence subgroup of  consisting of matrices that are congruent to the identity matrix when all entries are taken modulo 7.)

Fundamental domain and pants decomposition 
The Klein quartic can be obtained as the quotient of the hyperbolic plane by the action of a Fuchsian group. The fundamental domain is a regular 14-gon, which has area  by the Gauss-Bonnet theorem. This can be seen in the adjoining figure, which also includes the 336 (2,3,7) triangles that tessellate the surface and generate its group of symmetries.

Within the tessellation by (2,3,7) triangles is a tessellation by 24 regular heptagons. The systole of the surface passes through the midpoints of 8 heptagon sides; for this reason it has been referred to as an "eight step geodesic" in the literature, and is the reason for the title of the book in the section below. All the coloured curves in the figure showing the pants decomposition are systoles, however, this is just a subset; there are 21 in total. The length of the systole is 

An equivalent closed formula is

Whilst the Klein quartic maximises the symmetry group for surfaces of genus 3, it does not maximise the systole length. The conjectured maximiser is the surface referred to as "M3" . M3 comes from a tessellation of (2,3,12) triangles, and its systole has multiplicity 24 and length

The Klein quartic can be decomposed into four pairs of pants by cutting along six of its systoles. In particular, taking  to be the systole length, the coordinates are

The cubic graph corresponding to this pants decomposition is the tetrahedral graph, that is, the graph of 4 nodes, each connected to the other 3. The tetrahedral graph is similar to the graph for the projective Fano plane; indeed, the automorphism group of the Klein quartic is isomorphic to that of the Fano plane.

Spectral theory 

Little has been proved about the spectral theory of the Klein quartic. Because the Klein quartic has the largest symmetry group of surfaces in its topological class, much like the Bolza surface in genus 2, it has been conjectured that it maximises the first positive eigenvalue of the Laplace operator among all compact Riemann surfaces of genus 3 with constant negative curvature. It also maximizes mutliplicity of the first positive eigenvalue (8) among all such surfaces, a fact that has been recently proved. Eigenvalues of the Klein quartic have been calculated to varying degrees of accuracy. The first 15 distinct positive eigenvalues are shown in the following table, along with their multiplicities.

3-dimensional models 

However, many 3-dimensional models of the Klein quartic have been given, starting in Klein's original paper, which seek to demonstrate features of the quartic and preserve the symmetries topologically, though not all geometrically. The resulting models most often have either tetrahedral (order 12) or octahedral (order 24) symmetries; the remaining order 7 symmetry cannot be as easily visualized, and in fact is the title of Klein's paper.

Most often, the quartic is modeled either by a smooth genus 3 surface with tetrahedral symmetry (replacing the edges of a regular tetrahedron with tubes/handles yields such a shape), which have been dubbed "tetruses", or by polyhedral approximations, which have been dubbed "tetroids"; in both cases this is an embedding of the shape in 3 dimensions. The most notable smooth model (tetrus) is the sculpture The Eightfold Way by Helaman Ferguson at the Mathematical Sciences Research Institute in Berkeley, California, made of marble and serpentine, and unveiled on November 14, 1993. The title refers to the fact that starting at any vertex of the triangulated surface and moving along any edge, if you alternately turn left and right when reaching a vertex, you always return to the original point after eight edges. The acquisition of the sculpture led in due course to the publication of a book of papers , detailing properties of the quartic and containing the first English translation of Klein's paper. Some of these models consist of 20 triangles or 56 triangles (abstractly, the regular skew polyhedron {3,7|,4}, with 56 faces, 84 edges, and 24 vertices), which cannot be realized as equilateral, with twists in the arms of the tetrahedron; while others have 24 heptagons – these heptagons can be taken to be planar, though non-convex, and the models are more complex than the triangular ones because the complexity is reflected in the shapes of the (non-flexible) heptagonal faces, rather than in the (flexible) vertices.

Alternatively, the quartic can be modeled by a polyhedron with octahedral symmetry: Klein modeled the quartic by a shape with octahedral symmetries and with points at infinity (an "open polyhedron"), namely three hyperboloids meeting on orthogonal axes, while it can also be modeled as a closed polyhedron which must be immersed (have self-intersections), not embedded. Such polyhedra may have various convex hulls, including the truncated cube, the snub cube, or the rhombicuboctahedron, as in the small cubicuboctahedron at right. The small cubicuboctahedron immersion is obtained by joining some of the triangles (2 triangles form a square, 6 form an octagon), which can be visualized by coloring the triangles (the corresponding tiling is topologically but not geometrically the 3 4 | 4 tiling). This immersion can also be used to geometrically construct the Mathieu group M24 by adding to PSL(2,7) the permutation which interchanges opposite points of the bisecting lines of the squares and octagons.

Dessin d'enfants
The dessin d'enfant on the Klein quartic associated with the quotient map by its automorphism group (with quotient the Riemann sphere) is precisely the 1-skeleton of the order-3 heptagonal tiling. The resulting dessin is a "platonic" dessin, meaning edge-transitive and "clean" (each white point has valence 2).

Related Riemann surfaces
The Klein quartic is related to various other Riemann surfaces.

Geometrically, it is the smallest Hurwitz surface (lowest genus); the next is the Macbeath surface (genus 7), and the following is the First Hurwitz triplet (3 surfaces of genus 14). More generally, it is the most symmetric surface of a given genus (being a Hurwitz surface); in this class, the Bolza surface is the most symmetric genus 2 surface, while Bring's surface is a highly symmetric genus 4 surface – see isometries of Riemann surfaces for further discussion.

Algebraically, the (affine) Klein quartic is the modular curve X(7) and the projective Klein quartic is its compactification, just as the dodecahedron (with a cusp in the center of each face) is the modular curve X(5); this explains the relevance for number theory.

More subtly, the (projective) Klein quartic is a Shimura curve (as are the Hurwitz surfaces of genus 7 and 14), and as such parametrizes principally polarized abelian varieties of dimension 6.

More exceptionally, the Klein quartic forms part of a "trinity" in the sense of Vladimir Arnold, which can also be described as a McKay correspondence. In this collection, the projective special linear groups PSL(2,5), PSL(2,7), and PSL(2,11) (orders 60, 168, 660) are analogous. Note that 4 × 5 × 6/2 = 60, 6 × 7 × 8/2 = 168, and 10 × 11 × 12/2 = 660. These correspond to icosahedral symmetry (genus 0), the symmetries of the Klein quartic (genus 3), and the buckyball surface (genus 70). These are further connected to many other exceptional phenomena, which is elaborated at "trinities".

See also
Grünbaum–Rigby configuration
Shimura curve
Hurwitz surface
Bolza surface
Bring's curve
Macbeath surface
First Hurwitz triplet

References

Literature

. Paperback edition, Cambridge University Press, 2001, . Reviewed by:

External links 
 Klein's Quartic Curve, John Baez, July 28, 2006
 Klein's Quartic Curve, by Greg Egan – illustrations
 Klein's Quartic Equations, by Greg Egan – illustrations

Algebraic curves
Riemann surfaces
Differential geometry of surfaces
Systolic geometry